The Iditarod River is a  tributary of the Innoko River in the U.S. state of Alaska. The river begins north of Chuathbaluk and the Russian Mountains and flows northeast and then west to meet the larger river near Holikachuk.

Iditarod is an Anglicization of the Deg Hit’an (Athabascan) name for the river, Haiditirod or Haidilatna, which is probably an English version of the name of a village on the river, that may have corresponded with the village called Iditarod in the 1900s.

See also
List of rivers of Alaska

References

Rivers of Bethel Census Area, Alaska
Rivers of Alaska
Rivers of Yukon–Koyukuk Census Area, Alaska
Tributaries of the Yukon River
Rivers of Unorganized Borough, Alaska